Depot Road is a subzone within the planning area of Bukit Merah, Singapore, as defined by the Urban Redevelopment Authority (URA). Its boundary is made up of the Ayer Rajah Expressway (AYE) in the north; Alexandra Road in the west; Depot Road in the south; and Henderson Road in the east.

"Depot Road" is also the name of a two-way road in the area. The subzone took its name from this road.

References

Bukit Merah
Central Region, Singapore